Hertsön is a Swedish island in the Bothnian Bay, largely occupied by the eastern districts of the city of Luleå.

Due to post-glacial rebound, the islands Svartön, Mulön, Granön and Björkön have merged with the island. The size of the island is around 73.42 km², making it the twelfth largest island in Sweden.

References

Islands of Norrbotten County
Luleå